Holtanna Peak is a peak,  high, whose eastern portion is occupied by a small cirque glacier, standing  north of the Mundlauga Crags in the eastern part of Fenriskjeften Mountain in Queen Maud Land, Antarctica. It was mapped from surveys and air photos by the Sixth Norwegian Antarctic Expedition (1956–60) and named Holtanna (the hollow tooth).

References

Mountains of Queen Maud Land
Princess Astrid Coast